Van Putten is a Dutch toponymic surname meaning "from Putten". Most often Putten would have referred to the town Putten in Gelderland or the former island of Putten in South Holland. People with this name include:

Bryan van Putten (born 1985), Dutch Caribbean songwriter, singer, and guitarist
Evalina van Putten (born 1993), Curaçaoan beauty pageant winner
Maartje van Putten (born 1951), Dutch politician

See also
Putten (disambiguation)
Van de Putte - surname
Van der Putten - surname
Van Petten (disambiguation)
Gwendoline van Putten School, sole secondary school on the island of Sint Eustatius

References

Dutch-language surnames
Toponymic surnames
Surnames of Dutch origin